The EuroLeague Finals are the championship finals of the EuroLeague competition. The EuroLeague is the highest level tier, and most important professional club basketball competition in Europe.

Title holders

 ......1958  Rīgas ASK
 1958–59  Rīgas ASK
 1959–60  Rīgas ASK
 1960–61  CSKA Moscow
 1961–62  Dinamo Tbilisi
 1962–63  CSKA Moscow
 1963–64  Real Madrid
 1964–65  Real Madrid
 1965–66  Simmenthal Milano
 1966–67  Real Madrid
 1967–68  Real Madrid
 1968–69  CSKA Moscow
 1969–70  Ignis Varese
 1970–71  CSKA Moscow
 1971–72  Ignis Varese
 1972–73  Ignis Varese
 1973–74  Real Madrid
 1974–75  Ignis Varese
 1975–76  Mobilgirgi Varese
 1976–77  Maccabi Elite Tel Aviv
 1977–78  Real Madrid
 1978–79  Bosna
 1979–80  Real Madrid
 1980–81  Maccabi Elite Tel Aviv
 1981–82  Squibb Cantù
 1982–83  Ford Cantù
 1983–84  Banco Roma
 1984–85  Cibona
 1985–86  Cibona
 1986–87  Tracer Milano
 1987–88  Tracer Milano
 1988–89  Jugoplastika
 1989–90  Jugoplastika
 1990–91  POP 84
 1991–92  Partizan
 1992–93  Limoges CSP
 1993–94  7up Joventut
 1994–95  Real Madrid Teka
 1995–96  Panathinaikos
 1996–97  Olympiacos
 1997–98  Kinder Bologna
 1998–99  Žalgiris
 1999–00  Panathinaikos
 2000–01  Maccabi Elite Tel Aviv
 2000–01  Kinder Bologna
 2001–02  Panathinaikos
 2002–03  FC Barcelona
 2003–04  Maccabi Elite Tel Aviv
 2004–05  Maccabi Elite Tel Aviv
 2005–06  CSKA Moscow
 2006–07  Panathinaikos
 2007–08  CSKA Moscow
 2008–09  Panathinaikos
 2009–10  Regal FC Barcelona
 2010–11  Panathinaikos
 2011–12  Olympiacos
 2012–13  Olympiacos
 2013–14  Maccabi Electra Tel Aviv
 2014–15  Real Madrid
 2015–16  CSKA Moscow
 2016–17  Fenerbahçe
 2017–18  Real Madrid
 2018–19  CSKA Moscow
 2019–20 Cancelled due to COVID-19 pandemic
 2020–21  Anadolu Efes
 2021–22  Anadolu Efes

EuroLeague Finals
For finals not played in a single game, an * precedes the score of the team playing at home.

* 2001 was a transition year, with the best European teams split into two major leagues, (SuproLeague, held by FIBA Europe, and Euroleague, held by Euroleague Basketball).

Titles by club

Titles by national domestic league

Notes
 2001 was a transition year, with the best European teams split into two major leagues, SuproLeague, held by FIBA Europe and EuroLeague, held by Euroleague Basketball. The finals series of the latter:

EuroLeague Finals Top Scorers, MVPs, and Champion coaches (1958 to present)
From 1958 to 1987, the Top Scorer of the EuroLeague Finals was noted, regardless of whether he played on the winning or losing team. However, there was no actual MVP award given. On the other hand, since the end of the 1987–88 season, when the first modern era EuroLeague Final Four was held, an MVP is named at the conclusion of each Final Four, at the end of the EuroLeague Final.

* The 2000–01 season was a transition year, with the best European teams splitting into two different major leagues: The SuproLeague, held by FIBA Europe, and the EuroLeague, held by Euroleague Basketball.

Multiple EuroLeague Finals Top Scorers

Multiple EuroLeague Finals MVP award winners

Head coaches with the most finals appearances and players with the most championships

Finals appearances by head coach

* The 2000–01 season was a transition year, with the best European teams splitting into two different major leagues: The SuproLeague, held by FIBA Europe, and the EuroLeague, held by Euroleague Basketball.

Players with the most championships

Top scoring performances in EuroLeague Finals games

The top scoring performances in EuroLeague Finals games:

  Žarko Varajić (Bosna) 45 points vs. Emerson Varese (in 1978–79 Final)
  Vladimir Andreev (CSKA Moscow) 37 points vs. Real Madrid (in 1968–69 Final)
  Dražen Petrović (Cibona) 36 points vs. Real Madrid (in 1984–85 Final)
  Sergei Belov (CSKA Moscow) 36 points vs. Ignis Varese (in 1972–73 Final)
  Steve Chubin (Simmenthal Milano) 34 points vs. Real Madrid (in 1966–67 Final)
  Earl Williams (Maccabi Elite Tel Aviv) 31 points vs. Real Madrid (in 1979–80 Final)
  Emiliano Rodríguez (Real Madrid) 31 points vs. Spartak ZJŠ Brno (in first leg of 1963–64 Finals)
  Juan Antonio San Epifanio (FC Barcelona) 31 points vs. Banco di Roma (in 1983–84 Final)
  Wayne Hightower (Real Madrid) 30 points vs. Dinamo Tbilisi (in 1961–62 Final)
  Mirza Delibašić (Bosna) 30 points vs. Emerson Varese (in 1978–79 Final)
  Clifford Luyk (Real Madrid) 30 points vs. CSKA Moscow (in first leg of 1964–65 Finals)
  František Konvička (Spartak ZJŠ Brno) 30 points vs. Real Madrid (in first leg of 1963–64 Finals)

EuroLeague Finals attendance figures

Rosters of the EuroLeague Finalists

See also
EuroLeague Final Four
EuroLeague Final Four MVP
EuroLeague Finals Top Scorer
EuroLeague All-Final Four Team
FIBA European Champions Cup and EuroLeague history

References

External links
 EuroLeague Official Web Page
Linguasport
 InterBasket EuroLeague Basketball Forum
 TalkBasket EuroLeague Basketball Forum
 

 
Finals